The men's tournament of water polo at the 2000 Summer Olympics at Sydney, Australia, began on September 23 and lasted until October 1, 2000.

Medalists

Preliminary round

Group A

Group B

Classification for 9th-12th

Knockout stage

Bracket

Fifth place bracket

Quarterfinals

5–8th place semifinals

Semifinals

Seventh place game

Fifth place game

Bronze medal game

Gold medal game

Ranking and statistics

Final rankings

Multi-time Olympians

Six-time Olympian(s): 1 player
 : Manuel Estiarte

Five-time Olympian(s): 2 players
 : George Mavrotas
 : Jordi Sans

Four-time Olympian(s): 4 players
 : Filippos Kaiafas
 : Pedro García, Salvador Gómez, Jesús Rollán (GK)

Leading goalscorers

Source: Official Results Book (page 45–92)

Leading goalkeepers

Source: Official Results Book (page 45–92)

Leading sprinters

Source: Official Results Book (page 44)

References

Sources
 PDF documents in the LA84 Foundation Digital Library:
 Official Results Book – 2000 Olympic Games – Water Polo (download, archive)
 Water polo on the Olympedia website
 Water polo at the 2000 Summer Olympics (men's tournament)
 Water polo on the Sports Reference website
 Water polo at the 2000 Summer Games (men's tournament) (archived)

Water polo at the 2000 Summer Olympics
Men's events at the 2000 Summer Olympics